Todea barbara is known as the king fern. Occurring in moist areas of south eastern Australia, and also indigenous to New Zealand and South Africa.

Taxonomy
Carl Linnaeus described the king fern in volume II of his Species Plantarum as Acrostichum barbarum in 1753, from Africa. Thomas Moore gave it its current name in 1857.

Description

Distribution and habitat
The king fern grows alongside streams, in rainforest gullies and other wet spots in tall open forest. Occasionally it is found in drier sites in rock crevices among sandstone or granite cliffs or rockfaces.

.

In South Australia, the Todea barbara fern is increasingly rare, with small groups occurring in just a few disparate localities in the Mount Lofty Ranges.

The largest remaining stand was in Uraidla on private property, on the upper reaches of "Deep Creek", a tributary to Sixth Creek in the Torrens Catchment. In the 1970s, many ancient two metre tall fern trunks were removed by a plant poacher at night, possibly under the mistaken belief that they were tree ferns, which can transplant readily. Mature king ferns do not. There are a few remnants in this gully today and some local native plant specialists have propagated plants from spores from this site, which may be grown in the home garden or planted along creek edges.

In New Zealand, the king fern is restricted to Northland, where it is found from North Cape to Whangarei and Kai Iwi Lakes, and Three Kings Islands.

Cultivation
The Australian native plant industry has propagated many from spores. They can be readily acquired through nurseries as an ornamental plant for gardens and natural landscaping. Most of these will be of Victorian or NSW origin.

The king fern grows readily in gardens in temperate or subtropical climates. It prefers a spot in moist acidic soil in shade or dappled shade, though can grow in sunnier locations as long as it is watered often.

References

External links

Osmundales
Ferns of Africa
Ferns of Australasia
Ferns of Australia
Ferns of New Zealand
Flora of South Africa
Flora of New South Wales
Flora of Queensland
Flora of South Australia
Flora of Victoria (Australia)
Flora of Tasmania
Garden plants of Australasia
Plants described in 1753
Taxa named by Carl Linnaeus